Blood Oath is the sixth studio album by American death metal band Suffocation. The band began recording in-studio on January 31 with Joe Cincotta (who worked on the band's last two releases). The follow-up to 2006's self-titled record Suffocation was mixed by Zack Ohren and the cover artwork was once again designed by Jon Zig. It is the band's last album to feature drummer Mike Smith in full.  The track "Marital Decimation" is a re-recording of a track of the same name from the Breeding the Spawn album.

The album sold 3,600 copies in the United States in its first week of release to debut at position 135 on the Billboard 200, Suffocation's first entry in the Billboard charts.

Track listing

Release history

Personnel 

Suffocation
 Frank Mullen – vocals
 Terrance Hobbs – lead guitar
 Guy Marchais – rhythm guitar
 Derek Boyer – bass
 Mike Smith – drums

Production
 Zack Ohren – mixing
 Joe Cincotta – engineering
 John Scrip – mastering

References 
Citations

Further reading
 Suffocation: 'Blood Oath' To Arrive In July - Apr. 6, 2009 on Blabbermouth
 Suffocation:  'Blood Oath' Artwork, Track Listing Unveiled - Apr. 16 on Blabbermouth
 Suffocation: Final 'Blood Oath' Artwork and Special-Edition Details Revealed - Apr. 23, 2009 on Blabbermouth
 [ AMG Credit List] on AllMusic.com

Suffocation (band) albums
2009 albums
Nuclear Blast albums